Gustave Benthin (born February 10, 1991) is an American football nose guard who is currently a free agent. Benthin played football at Western Oregon University; following his graduation, he signed with the San Diego Chargers of the NFL. After failing to make the team, Benthin was assigned to the San Jose SaberCats of the Arena Football League. Benthin ended the 2015 season on the SaberCats' Injured Reserve; despite this, he collected his first AFL Champtionship when the SaberCats won ArenaBowl XXVIII at the end of the season. On December 14, 2015, Benthin was assigned to the Los Angeles KISS.

References

External links
 Western Oregon profile

1991 births
Living people
American football defensive tackles
Western Oregon Wolves football players
San Jose SaberCats players
Los Angeles Kiss players
Players of American football from Oregon
People from Clatsop County, Oregon